Stoch is a surname of West Slavic origin. It may refer to:
 Amy Stoch (born 1958), American actress (credited as Amy Stock or Amy Stock-Poynton)
 Andreas Stoch (born 1969), German politician
 Kamil Stoch (born 1987), Polish ski jumper
 Miroslav Stoch (born 1989), Slovak association footballer

See also
 
 Stochov
 Butters Stotch

West Slavic-language surnames
Polish-language surnames
Slovak-language surnames